The America Zone was one of the two regional zones of the 1951 Davis Cup.

5 teams entered the America Zone, with the winner going on to compete in the Inter-Zonal Final against the winner of the Europe Zone. The United States defeated Canada in the final, and went on to face Sweden in the Inter-Zonal Final.

Draw

Quarterfinals

United States vs. Japan

Semifinals

United States vs. Mexico

Canada vs. Cuba

Final

Canada vs. United States

References

External links
Davis Cup official website

Davis Cup Americas Zone
America Zone
Davis Cup